Patrick Joseph Casey (born 4 August 1941, Dublin, Ireland), commonly called Pat Casey, was an Ireland rugby union player.

He began playing rugby at school at C.B.C. Monkstown before moving onto University College Dublin. He played for Lansdowne Football Club (where he is in their hall of fame) and provincially for Leinster. He made his international  debut on 16 January, 1963 against France. He was capped 12 times, scoring three tries for Ireland at wing playing alongside the likes of Mike Gibson, Tony O'Reilly, Tom Kiernan and Willie John McBride.

Casey scored one of the greatest tries in Irish rugby history against England in an 18–5 rout at Twickenham in 1964. A move begun by débutante fly half Mike Gibson in their 22 was finished off by Casey. The game was one of the first ever rugby games captured by RTÉ television cameras. It is the largest win by any "Home Nation" team against England of all time in Twickenham.

Casey also scored a try for Leinster in the same year versus the All Blacks in an 11–8 defeat. A 40-yard interception almost made history for the Irish province.

References

1941 births
Living people
Rugby union players from Dublin (city)
Irish rugby union players
Ireland international rugby union players
Alumni of University College Dublin
Lansdowne Football Club players
University College Dublin R.F.C. players
People educated at C.B.C. Monkstown
Rugby union wings